Black August Revisited   is a digital album by rapper Killah Priest. 
The album was re-released in 2008 with full artwork. Originally it was an Internet-only release in a slimline jewel case.

Track listing

2003 albums
Killah Priest albums
Albums produced by Just Blaze